Sachem is a title given to a Native American paramount chief.

Sachem may also refer to:

 Sachem (butterfly), another name for the skipper butterfly Atalopedes campestris
 The Sachem, a Canadian newspaper
The Sachems, a secret society at Columbia University
 SS Sachem, ships with the name
 USS Sachem, US Navy vessels with the name
 A leader of Tammany Hall

See also
 Sachem Award, Indiana's highest civilian honor
 Sachem School District in Long Island, New York, United States